Nolin Lake State Park is a park located in Edmonson County, Kentucky, United States. The park is located on the northern perimeter of Mammoth Cave National Park.

The park contains a small beach, a country store, boat ramp, 32 developed campsites, 27 primitive campsites, and a playground.

On May 25, 1983, Nolin Lake set a record high of 549.9 mean sea level.

References

External links
Nolin Lake State Park Kentucky Department of Parks

State parks of Kentucky
Protected areas of Edmonson County, Kentucky
Protected areas established in 2001